Rolland H. "Rollie" Beale (January 16, 1930 – February 17, 2014) was an American racecar driver.

A native of Toledo, Ohio, Beale was the 1973 United States Auto Club Sprint Car Series champion, claiming 32 feature race wins in his career. He was inducted into the National Sprint Car Hall of Fame in 1996.

External links
National Sprint Car Hall of Fame & Museum
Racing-Reference page
Rollie Beale obituary
Rollie Beale remembered

1930 births
2014 deaths
American racing drivers
USAC Silver Crown Series drivers